Hoodlum is an Australian production company founded by Nathan Mayfield and Tracey Robertson, with a main office in Brisbane and a U.S. office in Los Angeles.
 
In 2014, Hoodlum's television division produced the six-part show Secrets & Lies for Network Ten Australia.  Hoodlum also produced the adaptation Secrets and Lies for ABC (U.S.), which is returning for a second season in 2016.

In 2012 Hoodlum produced The Strange Calls, a six-part narrative comedy series for Australia's ABC. In January 2015, a U.S. adaptation of The Strange Calls was ordered to pilot at NBC. Hoodlum is also working with ABC (U.S.) on a remake of Fat Cow Motel, their 13-part TV comedy series. In 2011, Hoodlum produced the FOX8 multiplatform 10-part TV drama series SLiDE, which was nominated for an International Emmy Kids Award.

In 2015, Hoodlum is producing for Disney a teen sci-fi feature film Red Sands set in the Australian Outback. Hoodlum is also developing the psychological thriller Exposure for A&E Studios and Lifetime (U.S.) and supernatural drama Tidelands for Netflix.

Hoodlum Digital has created multiplatform experiences for TV and Film franchises including - The Bourne Legacy, Lost (for which they won a Creative Arts Emmy), Spooks (for which they won two BAFTA Craft Awards), Primeval (their online game Primeval Evolved won an International Digital Emmy), Salt, Vikings, and Texas Rising.

References

Television production companies of Australia